Richard Wilhelm (10 May 18732 March 1930) was a German sinologist, theologian and missionary. He lived in China for 25 years, became fluent in spoken and written Chinese, and grew to love and admire the Chinese people. He is best remembered for his translations of philosophical works from Chinese into German that in turn have been translated into other major languages of the world, including English. His translation of the I Ching is still regarded as one of the finest, as is his translation of The Secret of the Golden Flower; both were provided with introductions by the Swiss psychiatrist Carl Jung, who was a personal friend.

Lau Nui Suan introduced Wilhelm to Chinese yoga philosophy and the psychology of the I Ching.

His son Hellmut Wilhelm was also a sinologist, and was professor of Chinese at the University of Washington. Wilhelm was a close friend of the renowned Chinese educator and diplomat Dr. Li Linsi.

The Richard Wilhelm Translation Centre at Ruhr-Universität Bochum was founded in 1993 by Helmut Martin.

References

Further reading
 
 
 Lackner, Michael. "Richard Wilhelm, a 'Sinicized' German Translator." (Archive) In: Alleton, Vivianne and Michael Lackner (editors). De l'un au multiple: traductions du chinois vers les langues européennes Translations from Chinese into European Languages. Éditions de la maison des sciences de l'homme (Les Editions de la MSH, FR), 1999, Paris. p. 86-97. , 9782735107681.

External links 

 
 Das Buch der Wandlungen, German translation
 Laotse - Tao Te King, German translation
 I Ching Translated by Richard Wilhelm, English translation
 Laotse - Tao Te King, English translation
 
 
 
 

1873 births
1930 deaths
Chinese–German translators
German sinologists
German expatriates in China
German male non-fiction writers
German translators